John Griffith  was the Governor of Bombay from 9 November 1795 to 27 December 1795.

References

Year of birth missing
Year of death missing
Governors of Bombay